Hemipachnobia is a genus of moths of the family Noctuidae.

Species
 Hemipachnobia monochromatea (Morrison, 1874) 
 Hemipachnobia subporphyrea (Walker, 1858)

References
Natural History Museum Lepidoptera genus database
Hemipachnobia at funet

Noctuinae